Knockane railway station was on the Cork and Muskerry Light Railway in County Cork, Ireland.

History

The station opened on 6 May 1893.

Passenger services were withdrawn on 31 December 1934.

Routes

Further reading

References

Disused railway stations in County Cork
Railway stations opened in 1893
Railway stations closed in 1934